The Elis James and John Robins show is a weekly radio show presented by British comedians Elis James and John Robins. Formerly broadcast on commercial radio station Radio X, the show now airs on BBC Radio 5 Live on Friday afternoons from 2:00pm–4:00pm. Highlights from the show are released as a weekly podcast. Robins has described the show as "a commercial indie radio show that has got wildly out of hand".

History
James and Robins have been friends since meeting on the comedy circuit in 2005 and fantasised about making a radio show together. Xfm had a tradition of having weekend shows hosted by male comedians and after their agent submitted a demo, James and Robins were granted a weekend slot, following in the footsteps of Ricky Gervais & Stephen Merchant, Adam and Joe, Jimmy Carr, Russell Brand and Josh Widdicombe. The Elis James and John Robins show debuted on Xfm London on Sunday 16 February 2014 in the 10:00am–1:00pm slot and was produced by Dave Masterman. The show moved to a Saturday 10:00am–1:00pm slot on 17 August 2014 before moving to Saturday afternoons from 1:00pm–4:00pm on 23 April 2016. Xfm rebranded as Radio X and began broadcasting nationwide in September 2015. Following Dave Masterman's departure from Radio X in April 2017, Vinay Joshi, who had worked on the show as an unpaid intern in 2014 before becoming a permanent producer at Radio X, and had more recently been alternating production duties with Masterman, took over as lead producer.

It was revealed on 27 March 2019 that James and Robins were leaving Radio X and the show would be ending after five years on air stating that they had "not left under a cloud of unproduceability".

On 2 April 2019, it was announced that James and Robins would begin broadcasting on BBC Radio 5 Live on Friday 31 May, reuniting with Masterman. The new show aired from 1:00pm–3:00pm on Fridays, before moving to a 2:00pm–4:00pm slot, and features a number of segments carried over from the Radio X show, such as "John's Shame Well" and "Made Up Games", as well as new features, chat and anecdotes. With no music or advert breaks on Radio 5 Live, almost the entire show is released in a weekly podcast. Since February 2020, various mid-week bonus episodes have been recorded and released on the podcast feed.

Format
The Radio X show traditionally opened with Robins introducing James with a dubious fact based on his Welsh heritage, for example:

On the Radio 5 Live show, James and Robins share the opening in alternate weeks, usually performing a scripted opening taking a humorous angle on current affairs, the BBC or other 5 Live presenters.

At Radio X, John would usually lead the main links during the show with Elis co-hosting. The show is mainly conversational and comedic with anecdotes based around John's obsessions (Frank Zappa, the rock band Queen, farthing collecting, bushcraft, session ales, pubs, Bristol, Golf) and Elis's obsessions (the Wales football team, Swansea City, the past, Welsh Socialism, Gorky's Zygotic Mynci, Super Furry Animals) forming a backbone of material. The producer regularly joins in with conversation.

Show Features
Are you on email? (formerly Email Of The Species) - A segment of the show where Elis and John read out and respond to listeners correspondence via the increasingly popular medium of email.
John's Shame Well - John reads emails from listeners confessing actions in the past that have caused anxiety and regret ever since.
Made Up Games - Listeners send in details of games they have invented with family or friends and Elis and John play some of them live on air. The winner of the game wins the right to play a music track of their choice.
Up Your Region - Elis reads his favourite local stories from newspapers.
Unsung Hero - Elis and John interview a person who has done something extraordinary that would otherwise not have been reported in the media. During the Coronavirus pandemic, this was changed to individuals helping in some way during the pandemic.
Ask John - Listeners ask John a question, such as the best way to fill a dishwasher. John will then answer these questions using only the power of his mind.
Petty Parliament - Listeners offer up daily occurrences that annoy them, and a potentially suitable punishment. Elis, John, and Dave all vote on if it passes or not.
Voicenote of the UK - An irregular feature launched in late 2021 in which listeners would send in voicenotes to the show via WhatsApp. The voicenote that Elis and John would deem to be the most impressive would then be played on the show. This feature was accompanied by a catchy jingle composed and sung by Producer Dave Masterman.
Backing Britain - Listeners submit voicenotes in which they list things that are great about Britain. This feature is in response to Producer Dave Masterman, who was jokingly accused of not backing Britain.

Retired features
Edgy Elis - Elis would pick a controversial opinion at random from a bag of opinions composed by John. Elis would then enter into an often absurd rant as inspired by the chosen opinion.
The Good-Deed Feed - Elis and John read out you good deeds that listeners send in to lighten up the COVID-19 lockdown.
Potato Potato - John and Elis continually say the word Potato to each other like a game of tennis. The person to say, Birdseye at the correct time was declared the winner. The correct time to say, Birdseye was decided on the general vibe of the game. This would take place before playing a Made Up Game.
The Potato Potato Years - In a mocking response to listener emails that Potato Potato was no longer funny and should be retired, Elis and John did retire the feature but replaced it by 'The Potato Potato Years' - playing recordings of old Potato Potato games multiple times while "analysing" them at deliberately extreme length, in a parody of British television programmes analysing past sports highlights.
Clarkson's hyperbole - Elis selects and reads out excerpts of over the top passages written by newspaper columnists.
Humblebrag Of The Week - Longest running feature in the show's history. John and Elis read out brags found on social media that are disguised as moans. The feature has been adapted to Humblebrag Of The Day when the duo have stood in for c on the weekday drive time show. 
Tick Off A Taste - Elis and John taste live on air a food item that has been sent in by listeners.
The Light Hearted Paper Review with Elis James - Elis, backgrounded by muzak, reads absurd or pointless local, national and international news stories from the week
John Googles The Traffic - A feature used during Elis and John's stand-in coverage of Johnny Vaughan's drivetime slot where John uses search engine Google to help listeners avoid traffic build ups on their commute home, interspersed with various absurd sound effects.
John's Gig Diaries - Excerpts from John's diary from when he first started comedy (circa 2005–2006).
Welsh Word of the Week - Elis picks and explains one of his favourite words from the Welsh language.
Sacred Cow - A musical artist or band would be discussed for either entrance to the 'paddock of the sacred cow' and earn their right to be critically acclaimed, or be banished to the 'abattoir' for over hyped music acts.
Winner Plays On - Elis and John would face 5 questions each on their chosen subject, with the winner awarded the right to play a music track of their choosing.
Textual Healing - Listeners would email or call in with a comedic problem for the lads to solve. Calls were taken live on air and sometimes featured comedians in disguise.
Teenage Fanclub - A short lived feature where Elis and John invited listeners to write in about tales of teenage bands and music fandom.
John Reads Aloud From Tony Blackburn's Autobiography - John read excerpts from Tony Blackburn's autobiography Poptastic! My Life In Radio, mocking the book's pomposity, banality and lack of self awareness.
A Robins Amongst The Pigeons - John read from his autobiography 'A Robins Amongst The Pigeons', a parody of Tony Blackburn's 'Poptastic! My Life In Radio'.
Judge Robins - John assumes the character of Judge Robins and rules on a dilemma submitted by a listener, dispensing what he believes to be a suitable punishment.
Elis' Gig Diaries - Excerpts from Elis' diary from when he first started comedy.
Super Texts (and tweets) - John's naming of a segment to cover responses to tweets and texts with a jingle set to the theme tune of children's cartoon series Superted.
Every Cloud - Tales of the small everyday things that had given listeners a reason to be cheerful (dubbed 'Silver Linings' by Elis).
BetaBet - A replacement for long running feature 'Winner Plays On'. John and Elis compete to name as many examples of a chosen subject in alphabetical order in 30 seconds. Eventually retired due to John consistently winning.
Anecdote and a Punchline - Spontaneous feature devised by John live on air but recurring several times. Elis begins telling an anecdote as part of a different segment of the show, loses his thread, loses confidence in the story or realises he's told the story before, and John plays a jingle mocking Elis' poor storytelling skills.

Achievements
John's persistent support of Queen paid dividends in 2017 when their single "Bohemian Rhapsody" was voted Radio X's Best Of British. John achieved a life goal in May 2017 as Elis and himself interviewed Brian May as part of his promotion of the Queen in 3D book. The interview was broadcast during the pair's coverage of the drive time slot on 23 May 2017.

Cover

Elis and John have covered the weekday drive time slot (4:00pm–7:00pm) from 2–6 January 2017, 6–17 March 2017, 10–13 April 2017 and 22 May-9 June 2017.

Podcast
Since the show began, a podcast of the show has been released soon after broadcast. The podcast begins with an introduction from Elis and John that has evolved into a response to email correspondence with regular podcast listeners, styled by Elis and John as PCDs (Podcast Devotees). Podcast listeners who have listened since the start of the podcast release have been named 'Oners' and listeners who have been late adopters but have listened to the whole back catalogue have been named 'Retro-Oners'. In correspondence listeners announce themselves via their status (Oner/Retro-Oner), and indicate when they started listening to the podcast (i.e. a '34er' for someone who stated listening at Episode 34).

Following the highlights of the radio broadcast Elis and John return for a closing segment called the "Keep It Session Sessions". In this segment they take turns to play a sample of a band or artist that they recommend or may have mentioned during a show.

In total, there are 264 'proper' episodes of the podcast from the Radio X show, plus a number of bonus episodes from when Elis and John covered other slots in the Radio X schedule. When Elis and John started a new show on BBC Radio 5 Live in May 2019, it marked the start of a new podcast beginning at episode 1.

How Do You Cope
In October 2019 Elis and John launched a new podcast "How Do You Cope?...with Elis and John" on 5 Live. It features Elis and John talking to celebrities about mental health issues they have faced.

A new series of this podcast was launched in Spring 2022.

Live shows
Following the broadcast of the A Robins Amongst The Pigeons book, live readings were played at selected venues in 2015. In late 2016 Elis and John took a version of their show on a tour of England, Scotland and Wales. Named The Elis James and John Robins Experience, the show began in October in Norwich and finished in the Kentish Town Fourm in November. Listeners who have attended the live shows have been christened 'live vibe tasters'. Upon releasing their book, The Holy Vible, the pair undertook a nationwide book tour, including an extended show at the Hammersmith Apollo featuring former producer Dave Masterman and Nish Kumar. On 28 July 2018, Elis and John broadcast the radio show live from the Kendal Calling music festival, which was put out as episode 230 of the podcast. It was announced that the 250th episode of the radio show would be broadcast in front of a live audience at the Comedy Store London on 22 December 2018.

On 26 April 2020, during the Coronavirus lockdown in the UK, Elis and John live-streamed An Evening With Elis and John (hosted by fellow comedian Ivo Graham), each broadcasting from their respective homes. The broadcast was a light-hearted “look back at their life, work, loves, regrets and cans”. This became a regular live stream gig.

Awards
The show won the Chortle Radio award on 20 March 2017. In 2020, the show won a Gold Award at the Audio and Radio Industry Awards in the category of 'Funniest Show'.

The show’s sister podcast on BBC Radio 5 Live, “How Do You Cope?...with Elis and John" won the Broadcasting Press Guild award for best podcast in 2021.

References

External links
 The Vibe Guide - an unofficial episode guide for the Elis James and John Robins Podcast
 Elis James and John Robins (BBC Radio 5 Live)

Radio X (United Kingdom)
BBC Radio 5 Live programmes
British comedy radio programmes